Numeric Annotation Glyphs or NAGs are used to annotate chess games when using a computer, typically providing an assessment of a chess move or a chess position. NAGs exist to indicate a simple annotation in a language independent manner.

NAGs were first formally documented in 1994 by Steven J. Edwards in his Portable Game Notation Specification and Implementation Guide. Within the PGN specification, 256 NAGs are proposed of which the first 140 are defined; the remainder were reserved for future definition.

Introduction 
A Numeric Annotation Glyph is composed of a dollar sign character ("$") immediately followed by one or more digit characters. Each NAG then has a specific meaning and often a standard typographical representation. The meanings first defined stemmed from the use of specific typographic symbols when annotators were commenting upon chess games; most especially in Chess Informant publications. The objective was to devise an alternative representation of these symbols which could be incorporated in the simple computer file format proposed as the PGN standard. This mechanism allowed often sophisticated typography to be expressed using the simple ASCII character set.

Since its inception there has been no attempt to further formalise or standardise the meaning of the undefined 116 NAGs although PGN editors, such as ChessPad, have variously used these higher glyphs.

Standard NAGs

Non-standard NAGs

Notes on tables 
 Some of the symbols are not rendered by some browsers
 The more exotic symbols used by Chess Informator are often derived from common mathematical typographic symbols; their mathematical meaning rarely has any relevance to their chess meaning
 The entries in the Unicode column are, respectively, the decimal and hexadecimal reference for the character or symbol
 The entries in the HTML column are named HTML entities for representing the symbol or character; the Unicode numeric value can always be used where a specific entity does not exist. For example, the left right double arrow ($239) can be represented as either Unicode decimal &#8660; (⇔) or Unicode hexadecimal &#x21D4; (⇔) or HTML &hArr; (⇔). Unless explicitly noted, the Unicode representation can be interpreted as a default.

See also 
 Chess annotation symbols

Notes

References

Sources 
Krogius, N; Livsic, A; Parma, B; Tajmanov, M. Encyclopedia of Chess Middlegames. (1980) Belgrade: Chess Informant. 

Malanovic, Aleksander (Editor) Encyclopedia of Chess Openings, volumes A-E. (1978) Belgrade: Chess Informant. 

Chess notation